Gregoia vitrosphaera is a species of small sea snail, a marine gastropod mollusk in the family Triviidae, the false cowries or trivias.

Description
The length of the shell attains 6.7 mm.

Distribution
This marine species occurs in the Coral Sea

References

 Dolin, L. (2001). Les Triviidae (Mollusca: Caenogastropoda) de l'Indo-Pacifique: Révision des genres Trivia, Dolichupis et Trivellona = Indo-Pacific Triviidae (Mollusca: Caenogastropoda): Revision of Trivia, Dolichupis and Trivellona. in: Bouchet, P. et al. (Ed.) Tropical deep-sea benthos. Mémoires du Muséum national d'Histoire naturelle. Série A, Zoologie. 185: 201-241
 Fehse D. (2017). Contributions to the knowledge of the Triviidae, XXIX-M. New Triviidae from the New Caledonia and comments on Dolin's (2001) 'Les Triviidae de l'Indo-Pacifique'. Visaya. suppl. 8: 150-238

Triviidae
Gastropods described in 2001